Aeschynomene aspera is a species of flowering plant in the family Fabaceae. It is also known by the names  sola (Odia ସୋଲ), shola (Bengali শোলা) sola pith plant, pith plant, laugauni (Hindi) ponguchedi (Malayalam) or Netti (Tamil). Pith of low density from this plant is used to make hats known as pith helmets or sola topis.

It is native to Bangladesh, Bhutan, Cambodia, India, Indonesia, Laos, Malaysia, Myanmar, Nepal, Pakistan, Sri Lanka, Thailand, and Vietnam.

It is an aquatic plant and is considered a minor weed of rice paddies across its range.

Used part
From the biological viewpoint, the used part is the wood of the stem (often mistaken as pith, but it is not).

Aeschynomene sp. woods is one of the lightest woods in the world. Aeschynomene woods feel like a piece of thermocol or even lighter, and have a corky texture. It is bright white to off-white (white with a slight reddish or yellowish tinge) in color.

This corky material is used to make some traditional Indian crafts and artworks, and also decorative objects for worship, etc.

The young leaves and flowers are eaten in salads during times of famine in Cambodia, where the plant is known as snaô 'âm'bâhs (snaô="edible flowers", 'âm'bâhs="filamentous", Khmer language). In local medicine in Cambodia, it is used to treat uterine bleeding.

Gallery

See also
 Sholapith

References

 

aspera
Plants described in 1753
Taxa named by Carl Linnaeus